The William Green Building is a , 33-floor skyscraper in Columbus, Ohio, United States. It was constructed from 1987 to 1990, and was topped out on June 8, 1988. It is the third-tallest building in Columbus, the tallest constructed in 1990s and the eighth-tallest building in Ohio. The low-rise wing that extends to North High Street is constructed on the former site of the Chittenden Hotel.

The offices of the Ohio Bureau of Workers' Compensation are located here.

See also
List of tallest buildings in Columbus

References

External links
Emporis
Skyscraperpage

Skyscraper office buildings in Columbus, Ohio
Buildings in downtown Columbus, Ohio
NBBJ buildings
Office buildings completed in 1990